Salix reticulata, the net-leaved willow, or snow willow, is a dwarf willow, native to the colder parts of Europe, North America, and Northern Asia. It is found in the western United States (Salix reticulata subsp. nivalis), including the Sierra Nevada and Rocky Mountains. In Europe it extends south through the Carpathian Mountains and Alps to the Pyrenees and the mountains of Bulgaria and North Macedonia. It is common in Canada, Greenland and Finland, and present but rare in Scotland.

The plant grows on wet, often slightly calcareous, rocks and ledges.

Description
The twigs are slightly hairy at first, then hairless and dark reddish-brown later.

Leaves are 1.2 cm to 5 cm long, 1 to 3.5 cm wide; densely hairy at first, becoming hairless at least on the upper side. The leaves have a conspicuous network of veins.

In Spring, slender yellow catkins with pink tips appear.

Cultivation
Salix reticulata is cultivated as an ornamental plant, for use as groundcover. It has gained the Royal Horticultural Society's Award of Garden Merit.

References

Further reading

Gallery

External links

 Jepson Manual Treatment: Salix reticulata subsp. nivalis

reticulata
Flora of Europe
Flora of temperate Asia
Flora of North America
Garden plants of Europe
Garden plants of North America
Groundcovers
Plants described in 1753
Taxa named by Carl Linnaeus